The European White Elm cultivar Ulmus laevis 'Punctata' was mentioned in 1873, 1889, and later in 1903 as U. effusa (: laevis) f. punctata, but without description.

Description
It was described as having leaves flecked with white. Jäger and Beissner described it as having dotted young branches.

Cultivation
No specimens are known to survive.

References

European white elm cultivar
Ulmus articles missing images
Ulmus
Missing elm cultivars